Alnus sieboldiana (オオバヤシャブシ in Japanese) is an alder species found on the islands of Honshū, Shikoku, and Suwanose-jima in Japan.

A. sieboldiana contains the ellagitannins alnusiin, tellimagrandin I, pedunculagin, casuarinin, casuariin and 2,3-O-(S)-hexahydroxydiphenoyl-D-glucose.

The Latin specific epithet sieboldiana refers to German physician and botanist Philipp Franz von Siebold (1796–1866).

References

External links 

sieboldiana
Endemic flora of Japan
Plants described in 1902
Trees of Japan